Ramesh Bidhuri (born 18 July 1961) is a Member of the India Parliament and a member of the Bharatiya Janata Party (BJP).

Bidhuri and members of his family have been active members of the Rashtriya Swayam Sewak Sangh from their early childhood. Sh. Bidhuri started his political career as a student when he was elected as the central councilor of Saheed Bhagat Singh College and to the executive council of Delhi University. He is serving South Delhi Constituency second time in a row as an MP and has served as an MLA thrice before being elected as an MP.

He is currently the Member of Parliament representing South Delhi (Lok Sabha constituency) and Chairman of the Petroleum and Natural Gas Committee.

Early life  
Ramesh Bidhuri was born to Ramrikh Bidhuri and Charto Devi. He is married to Kamla Bidhuri and has two sons and a daughter. He has three older brothers and one younger brother. He did his initial schooling at G.B.S.S School No. 2, Kalkaji, New Delhi.

Since his college days, he has been active in politics. He chose the BJP as his political party. As mentioned before he was a member of the student council and he was General Secretary in the BJP in Delhi State. In 2003–08 he was the Vice President of BJP Delhi. He won three consecutive terms as MLA from 2003 to 2014. BJP chose him for MP candidate in the 2014 Lok Sabha election and currently he is Member of parliament (Lok Sabha). His father, late Shri Ramrikh, was a social worker.

Political career  
Since his college days, Bidhuri was active in politics. As a student leader he worked diligently and dedicatedly for ABVP since 1983. Sh. Bidhuri completed his graduation in B.Com. from Saheed Bhagat Singh College(M), Delhi University and completed his degree in law (LLB) from Ch. Charan Singh University, Meerut and is now Advocate in Delhi High Court.

Since 1993 he has worked actively in politics occupying prestigious posts in several religious and political organizations. He worked as the District Gen. Secretary Mehrauli district in the year 1996 and served as the Pradesh Secretary of Dharm Yatra of Mahasangh. He also served the party from 1997 to 2003 as District President BJP. He also worked actively as the Vice President BJP Delhi Pradesh from 2003 to 2008. Currently, he is Gen. Secretary, BJP Delhi Pradesh – a position he has occupied since 2008. He joined BJP and has been 3 times MLA from Tughlakabad. In the 2014 Indian general election, Bidhuri was declared as the candidate from South Delhi constituency by BJP. Bidhuri won the election from the South Delhi constituency. He is currently the Member of Parliament representing South Delhi.

In 2019, he defeated Aam Aadmi Party's Raghav Chadha and Indian National Congress's Vijender Singh in elections in South Delhi (Lok Sabha constituency) by gaining more than 54% votes.

References

External links

1961 births
Living people
India MPs 2014–2019
Lok Sabha members from Delhi
Delhi MLAs 2003–2008
Delhi MLAs 2008–2013
Delhi MLAs 2013–2015
Bharatiya Janata Party politicians from Delhi
People from South Delhi district
India MPs 2019–present